Lavausseau is a former commune in the Vienne department in the Nouvelle-Aquitaine region in western France. On 1 January 2019, it was merged into the new commune Boivre-la-Vallée.

The river Boivre runs through it.

See also
Communes of the Vienne department

References

Former communes of Vienne